Nachterstedt is a village and a former municipality in the district of Salzlandkreis, in Saxony-Anhalt, Germany. Since 15 July 2009, it is part of the town Seeland.

2009 Landslide

On July 18, 2009, a 350-meter long part of the bank of the nearby artificial Concordia lake slid into the water. Two houses were located on the area which ended up in the lake and three inhabitants got buried and were declared lost.

External links
 (de) Official website
 (en) Deutsche Welle article about the landslide

Former municipalities in Saxony-Anhalt
Seeland, Germany